Woman is an English weekly magazine launched in 1937.  Its target audience is for 30-to 40-year-old women. It encompasses a mix of celebrity gossip and TV news, real-life stories, and  fashion and beauty tips. Its lifestyle section offers ideas on homes, interiors and food,  product reviews, and  advice.

Odhams Press founded the first colour weekly, Woman in 1937, for which it set up and operated a dedicated high-speed print works. Its first editor, Mary Grieve, led the magazine until 1962, and was awarded an OBE for services to journalism. She was asked with other editors to advise the government during World War II, on women's perspectives during the war, as well as ensuring that the magazine provided a range of fashion tips to cope with clothes rationing as well as recipes to deal with the shortages and alternatives. In August 1943, the recipes article focused on uses of "Household milk", which was how they referred to powdered milk.

Woman is published by Future plc. For the second half of 2013 the circulation of the magazine was 252,239 copies. In 2021, with more online options and 'women's' titles available, it had dropped down to 92,281.

References

External links
 Official website

1937 establishments in the United Kingdom
Weekly magazines published in the United Kingdom
Women's magazines published in the United Kingdom
Celebrity magazines published in the United Kingdom
Entertainment magazines published in the United Kingdom
Magazines established in 1937
Odhams Press magazines